The Atlanta Rhinos are an American professional rugby league team based in Atlanta, Georgia.  2014 was their inaugural season in the USA Rugby League.  Starting in 2021, the club turned professional, and became founding members of the North American Rugby League. They play all their home games at Atlanta Silverbacks Park.

History

2014-2020: Foundations and USARL
Atlanta were founded in early 2014 and joined the USARL Southern Conference. By March, it was announced that Atlanta would share a partnership with British Super League club Leeds Rhinos. The Rhinos stated they will help bring a professional approach to the Atlanta club by sharing information and playing talent. Following the announcement of the partnership with Leeds, Atlanta announced they would adopt Leeds' Rhinos moniker, colours and similar club crest.

The clubs first season in the USARL was positive winning two of their six Conference games and losing their first playoff game. They built on their positive first season by winning the 2015 Southern Conference and making it to the Grand Final, eventually losing 44-12 to Boston Thirteens. The Rhinos failed to build upon their success the following season finishing third however still qualifying for the playoffs and making the semifinals eventually losing to Jacksonville Axemen.

The 2017 season was another successful one for the Rhinos, winning the Southern Conference without losing having won five and drawn one game. They faced Northern Conference champions New York Knights in the Grand Final who they beat 32-18 to win their first major Championship. They were semi finalists again in 2018 losing again to eventual Champions Jacksonville Axemen.

In what would be their final season in the USARL the club were deducted two points for forfeiting a game in round 8 which lead to them finishing third in the Southern Conference and missing out on the playoffs.

2021-present: NARL
It was announced in March 2021 that the Rhinos would withdraw from the USARL to compete in the professional North American Rugby League. The club also changed their logo, and colours to gold, white and black .

Current squad 
 Nick Newlin
 Fotukava Malu
 John Talisa
 Pita Godinet
 Harry Higgins
 Maciu Koroi
 Frederick Henry-Ajudua
 Sean Hunt
 John Scotti

Honours

League
USARL:
Winners (1): 2017,
Runners up (1): 2015,

References

External links
 Official website

USA Rugby League teams
Rugby clubs established in 2014
Sports teams in Atlanta
2014 establishments in Georgia (U.S. state)
Rugby league in Georgia (U.S. state)